Randy Burchell (born July 2, 1955) is a Canadian former professional ice hockey goaltender.

During the 1976–77 season Burchell played five games in the World Hockey Association (WHA) with the Indianapolis Racers.

References

External links

1955 births
Living people
Anglophone Quebec people
Canadian ice hockey goaltenders
Indianapolis Racers players
Mohawk Valley Comets players
Ice hockey people from Montreal
Tidewater Sharks players